All Quiet on the Western Front is a 1929 novel by German writer Erich Maria Remarque.

All Quiet on the Western Front may also refer to:

 All Quiet on the Western Front (1930 film), an adaptation of Remarque's novel, directed by Lewis Milestone
 All Quiet on the Western Front (1979 film), a TV film adaptation of the book starring Richard Thomas
 All Quiet on the Western Front (2022 film), an adaptation of Remarque's novel, directed by Edward Berger
 "All Quiet on the Western Front" (song), 1982, by Elton John

See also 
 All Quiet on the Preston Front, a UK TV series
 Not So Quiet on the Western Front (disambiguation)